Ainscow is a surname. Notable people with the surname include:

Alan Ainscow (born 1953), English footballer
Andy Ainscow (born 1968), English footballer

English-language surnames